Pot Black was a snooker tournament in the United Kingdom broadcast on the BBC. Each match was contested over a single , where other tournaments were significantly longer. The event carried no ranking points, but played a large part in the popularisation of the modern game of snooker. The event was first held in 1969 with a field of eight players and ran annually until 1986. The event resurfaced for three years in both 1991 and 2005. The series was followed by events for other categories of players, with a juniors and seniors events, and a celebrity version held in 2006.

The series was created by the BBC2 controller David Attenborough, shortly after BBC2 began broadcasting in colour. Snooker, a game using coloured balls, was suggested as a suitable way to sell the new technology. The series helped transform snooker from a minority sport played by just a handful of professionals into one of the most popular sports in the UK. Mark Williams made the highest  in the competition's history, a 119.

History
The BBC began broadcasting in colour in 1967 and was looking for programmes that could exploit the new technology. The idea of broadcasting snooker, then still a minor sport, was the brainchild of David Attenborough who was the controller of BBC2 at the time. The first Pot Black event was held in 1969 at the BBC Studios in Birmingham, and the programme was aired on BBC2 on 23 July 1969. This first contest featured eight players: Gary Owen, Jackie Rea, John Pulman, Ray Reardon, Fred Davis, Rex Williams, Kingsley Kennerley and John Spencer, with Reardon the eventual winner. The event continued until 1986, by which time an increasing number of snooker events were being televised and the Pot Black format was becoming outdated. The programme returned in 1990, but was discontinued after the 1993 event.

A one-day Pot Black tournament, held on 29 October 2005, was broadcast on the BBC's Grandstand. The event featured eight players: Ronnie O'Sullivan, Stephen Hendry, Stephen Maguire, Matthew Stevens, Paul Hunter, John Higgins, Jimmy White and Shaun Murphy, with Stevens beating Murphy in the final. The 2006 edition of the tournament took place at the Royal Automobile Club in Central London on 2 September 2006. Mark Williams defeated John Higgins in the final, achieving the highest break in the history of the tournament with a 119 clearance. The 2007 edition, the final Pot Black to date, was aired on Saturday 6 October 2007, with Ken Doherty beating Shaun Murphy 71–36 in the final.

There have been six century breaks at the event. Eddie Charlton compiled the first century in 1973, a break of 110, which stood as the event record for many years until overtaken by Shaun Murphy's 111 against Jimmy White in 2005, and Williams's 119 clearance in 2006.

Format
The tournament used many formats over its history. Eight players participated in the first event, but the number of players varied between six and sixteen over the years. It was originally played as a knockout tournament, but later employed a round-robin format. Most matches were played over a single frame. Several formats were used for the final, which was initially also played over just one frame; an aggregate score over two frames was tried in 1974, but this format was abandoned and the single-frame final returned in 1975; from 1978 to 1986, and in 1991, the final was decided over three frames. A shot clock format was added in 1991, to limit the time each player could spend at the table.

A Junior Pot Black ran from 1981 to 1983, and in 1991. The winners were Dean Reynolds, John Parrott and O'Sullivan. The event was revived as a side event to the World Snooker Championship, with the final played on the main match table. A Seniors Pot Black was held in 1997, featuring players who were aged over 40 at the time. Joe Johnson won the event.

A one frame Celebrity Pot Black was held on 15 July 2006 for Sport Relief. It was contested between the team of Ronnie O'Sullivan and Bradley Walsh and the team of Steve Davis and Vernon Kay. Davis and Kay won the contest. It was presented by Dermot O'Leary, commentated by John Parrott, and refereed by Michaela Tabb.

Production
The events were recorded in a single day at the BBC's Pebble Mill Studios in Birmingham, but the matches were shown in half-hour programmes over the winter. The press co-operated by revealing the scores only after a match had been transmitted. In 2005 and 2006, the whole tournament was broadcast on a single day. Pot Blacks theme tune was "Black and White Rag", composed by George Botsford and performed by Winifred Atwell.

The first series of Pot Black in 1969 was hosted by Keith Macklin. It was then hosted by Alan Weeks until 1984, and David Icke took over in 1985 and 1986. Eamonn Holmes hosted the event in 1991 and 1992, but was replaced by David Vine in 1993. Vine also hosted Senior Pot Black in 1997. The latest revival of the event was hosted by Hazel Irvine. Pot Black is credited with producing one of the most memorable British sports quotes: commentator Ted Lowe, aware that not all viewers had colour televisions, said "and for those of you who are watching in black and white, the pink is next to the green."

Winners
Below is a list of the winners by tournament.

Pot Black

Junior Pot Black

Seniors Pot Black

Notes

References

 
Snooker competitions in England
Snooker non-ranking competitions
Defunct snooker competitions
Recurring sporting events established in 1969
Recurring sporting events established in 1981
Recurring sporting events disestablished in 2007
Recurring sporting events disestablished in 2010
1969 establishments in England
1981 establishments in England
2007 disestablishments in England
2010 disestablishments in Wales
1960s British sports television series
1970s British sports television series
1980s British sports television series
1990s British sports television series
2000s British sports television series